Rumspringa, also spelled Rumschpringe or Rumshpringa, is a rite of passage during adolescence, translated from originally Palatine German and other Southwest German dialects to English as "jumping or hopping around", used in some Amish communities. The Amish, a subsect of the Anabaptist Christian movement, intentionally segregate themselves from other communities as a part of their faith. For Amish youth, the Rumspringa normally begins at age 16 and ends when a youth chooses either to be baptized in the Amish church or to leave the community. For Wenger Mennonites, Rumspringa occurs mostly between ages of 17 and 21. 

Not all Amish use this term (it does not occur in John A. Hostetler's extended discussion of adolescence among the Amish), but in sects that do, Amish elders generally view it as a time for courtship and finding a spouse. A popular view exists by which the period is institutionalized as a rite of passage, and the usual behavioral restrictions are relaxed, so that Amish youth can acquire some experience and knowledge of the non-Amish world.

Etymology 
Rumspringa is a Pennsylvania German noun meaning "running around." It is a cognate of the Standard German verb rumspringen. Dialects do not derive from standard languages, but as a cognate, this expression is closely related to the Standard German verb (he)rumspringen meaning "to jump around or about." The Standard German term is a compound word of the adverb  (around, about) and the verb  ("to jump"). However, in Swiss German as in some other southern German dialects, springen – besides meaning "to jump" – also means "to run." This term/concept also is used as a separable verb, i.e.,  (to jump around) / er springt rum (he jumps around).

In Pennsylvania German, the prefix rum is a contraction of herum – a development which is also all but general to spoken standard German. The infinitive (and gerund) form "-a" is standard in Pennsylvania German and other forms of general Upper German.

Popularized view 
Amish adolescents may engage in rebellious behavior, resisting or defying parental norms. In many cultures, enforcement may be relaxed, and misbehavior tolerated or overlooked to a degree. A view of rumspringa has emerged in popular culture that this divergence from custom is an accepted part of adolescence or a rite of passage for Amish youth.

Among the Amish, however, rumspringa simply refers to adolescence. During that time a certain amount of misbehavior is unsurprising and is not severely condemned (for instance, by Meidung or shunning). Adults who have made a permanent and public commitment to the faith would be held to the higher standards of behavior defined in part by the Schleitheim and Dordrecht confessions. In a narrow sense, the young are not bound by the Ordnung because they have not taken adult membership in the church. Amish adolescents do remain, however, under the strict authority of parents who are bound to Ordnung, and there is no period when adolescents are formally released from these rules.

It is the period when the young person is regarded as having reached maturity, and is permitted to attend the Sunday night "singings" that are the focus of courtship among the Amish; according to Amish sources, a youth who dares to attend one of these events before the age of 16 might be force-fed warm milk from a spoon, as a good-natured reminder to observe the lines of status. Members of the local church district often attend the singings and usually bring younger children along.

A minority of Amish youth do diverge from established customs. Some may be found:
 Wearing non-traditional clothing and hair styles (referred to as "dressing English")
 Driving vehicles other than horse-drawn vehicles (for communities that eschew motor vehicles)
 Not attending home prayer
 Drinking and using other recreational drugs

Not all youth diverge from custom during this period; approximately half in the larger communities and the majority in smaller Amish communities remain within the norms of Amish dress or behavior during adolescence. Almost 90 percent of Amish teenagers choose to be baptized and join the Amish church.

Leaving the community 
Some Amish youth do indeed separate themselves from the community, even going to live among the "English," or non-Amish Americans, experiencing modern technology.  Their behavior during this time does not necessarily prevent them from returning for adult baptism into the Amish church.

Most of them do not wander far from their family's homes during this time, and large numbers (85%–90%) ultimately choose to join the church. However this proportion varies from community to community, and within a community between more and less acculturated Amish. For example, Swartzentruber Amish have a lower retention rate than Andy Weaver Amish (90% vs 97%; although most of Swartzentruber Amish do not allow teenagers to leave the community during rumspringa at will). This figure was significantly lower as recently as the 1950s. Leaving the Amish community is not a long-term trend, and was more of a problem during the early colonial years.

Variations 
As among the non-Amish, there is variation among communities and individual families as to the best response to adolescent misbehavior. Some Amish communities hold views similar to Old Order Mennonite, and Conservative Mennonites in seeking more productive, spiritual activities for their youth. Some even take up meditation.

In some cases, patience and forbearance prevail, and in others, vigorous discipline. Far from an open separation from parental ways, the misbehavior of young people during the rumspringa is usually furtive, though often collective (this is especially true in smaller and more isolated populations). They may or may not mingle with non-Amish in these excursions. The age is marked normatively in some Amish communities by allowing the young man to purchase a small "courting buggy," or – in some communities – by painting the yard-gate blue (traditionally meaning "daughter of marriageable age living here"; the custom is noted by A. M. Aurand in The Amish (1938), along with the reasonable caution that sometimes a blue gate is just a blue gate). There is some opinion that adolescent rebellion tends to be more radical, more institutionalized (and therefore in a sense more accepted) in the more restrictive communities.

The nature of the rumspringa period differs from individual to individual and from community to community. In large Amish communities like those of Lancaster County, Pennsylvania, Holmes and Wayne Counties, Ohio, and Elkhart and LaGrange Counties, Indiana, the Amish are numerous enough that an Amish youth subculture exists. During rumspringa, the Amish youth in these large communities will join one of various groups ranging from the most rebellious to the least. These groups are not necessarily divided across traditional Amish church district boundaries, although they often are. In many smaller communities, Amish youth may have a much more restricted rumspringa, and likewise may be less likely to partake in strong rebellious behavior, as they lack the anonymity of larger communities.

Wenger Mennonites youth go through a period of rumspringa starting at age 17 and typically ending at marriage, a few years older than the Amish do. Since most of the youth get baptized when they are ages 16 to 19, they typically do not get into the type of serious offenses of the most "disorderly" of the Amish youth.

Literature

Scholarly and documentary works 
Rumspringa is mentioned in the standard works about the Amish, like Hostettler’s Amish Society, the works of Donald Kraybill, An Amish Paradox by Hurst and McConell and others, but there is only one scholarly book about it:
 Richard A. Stevick: Growing up Amish: The Teenage Years, Baltimore, 2007.

There is also one documentary book:
 Tom Shachtman: Rumspringa: To Be or Not to Be Amish, New York, 2006.
 Devil's Playground (2002) was nominated for the Independent Spirit Award for Best Documentary and for three documentary Emmy Awards—Best Documentary, Editing, and Direction. Spin-offs of the film include a book of transcribed interviews, titled Rumspringa: To Be Or Not To Be Amish, and a UPN reality television series, Amish in the City.

Fiction
Levi Miller's 1989 novel Ben's Wayne describes the rumspringa of an 18-year-old Amish youth in Holmes County, Ohio, during the fall of 1960. According to Richard A. Stevick, the novel is a realistic portrayal of the rumspringa of that time.

Biographies 
Rumspringa is also mentioned in several biographies of ex-Amish like e.g. Ira Wagler's Growing up Amish.

Other 
There are several books in the literary genre Amish romance who deal with rumspringa, but mostly with no gain in knowledge about the subject. Levi Miller's novel Ben's Wayne is an exception, since it is a realistic portray of rumspringa in 1960.
Levi Miller: Ben's Wayne, Intercourse, PA, 1989.

In popular culture
Amish teens throw a wild party which includes Fall Out Boy in the film Sex Drive.

A season 6 episode of the sitcom New Girl entitled “Rumspringa” features three of the main characters going on a trip which they refer to as a rumspringa.

A season 6 episode of the Canadian sitcom Letterkenny entitled "Dyck's Slip Out" features two characters who go missing on their rumspringa.

A season 5 episode of the series Bones features the main characters trying to solve the murder of an Amish teen who was on his rumspringa.

A season 5 episode of the drama Cold Case entitled "Running Around" features the main characters trying  to solve the murder of an Amish teen who was on her rumspringa.

A Netflix movie called Rumspringa was released in 2022 and features the experiences of a young Amish on Rumspringa in Berlin.

Episode 9, Season 10 of E.R titled “Missing” has, as its central storyline, 2 Amish teenagers, involved in a car collision whilst exploring Chicago. They both must choose whether to return or not.

References 

Protestantism in Pennsylvania
Rites of passage
Amish
Mennonitism
Religion in Lancaster, Pennsylvania
Adolescence

de:Rumspringa